My Mowgli Boy (Chinese: 我的莫格利男孩) is a 2019 Chinese urban romance comedy television series directed by Peng Xuejun. It stars Ma Tianyu as Mowgli and Yang Zi as Ling Xi in the lead roles. It premiered on iQIYI on August 29, 2019 and finished broadcasting on October 10, 2019. It also aired primetime on Shenzhen Satellite TV starting from April 12th 2020.

The series tells the story of Mo Ge Li, a boy raised in the jungle by the forest caretaker, who is accidentally brought into the city by Ling Xi, an independent entrepreneurial woman and called on people to protect the environment.

Plot summary
Mo Ge Li (played by Ma Tianyu) is a boy who was raised in the forest by his grandfather who was the forest caretaker. He grew up playing with animals in the forest since childhood. Ling Xi (played by Yang Zi), an independent career-focused woman, took Mo Ge Li back to the city by mistake. She wanted to send Mo Ge Li back to the forest as soon as possible, but she had to keep him because of the marketing needs of her Studio. Ling Xi and Mo Ge Li lived under the same roof, and the two gradually developed feelings for each other. As a bridge between human beings and nature, with the help of Ling Xi, Mo Ge Li gradually learned how to integrate into modern social life. Ling Xi learned the philosophy of nature from Mo Ge Li, and joined the ranks of ecological protection to save the environment. The two learned from each other and grew together.

Casts and Characters

Main cast

Supporting cast

Reception
The series was praised for its concept of environmental protection, and its sense of fashion in clothing.

Soundtrack
The series has 7 original soundtracks in total. The opening theme song "You are Like the Wind" was sung by singer Jin Wenqi and the ending theme song "Windy Night" was sung by the lead actress of the series Yang Zi.

Awards and nominations

References

External links

My Mowgli Boy on iQiyi

2010s Chinese television series
Chinese web series
2019 Chinese television series debuts
2019 Chinese television series endings
Chinese romantic comedy television series
Television series by Croton Media